Mshana is a village (selo) in Lviv Raion, Lviv Oblast (province) of western Ukraine. It belongs to Horodok urban hromada, one of the hromadas of Ukraine.

Geography 

History
The first record of the village dates back to 1453 year. The origin of the name of the village probably derives from Polish words 'msha' (of God liturgy).

Until 18 July 2020, Mshana belonged to Horodok Raion. The raion was abolished in July 2020 as part of the administrative reform of Ukraine, which reduced the number of raions of Lviv Oblast to seven. The area of Horodok Raion was merged into Lviv Raion.

Sights
The village has an architectural monument of local importance of Horodok Raion (Horodok district) – Introduction of the Blessed Virgin Mary Church (wooden, 1799) (1574 –м).

References

External links 
 village Mshana
 weather.in.ua

Literature 
  Page 260

Villages in Lviv Raion